A number of steamships were named Tolosa, including

, a Norwegian cargo ship in service 1916–27
, an American Design 1019 cargo ship in service 1920–40
, a Norwegian cargo ship in service 1930–44

Ship names